Ficus greiffiana is a species of plant in the family Moraceae. It is found in Argentina, Brazil, Colombia, and Guyana.

References

greiffiana
Least concern plants
Taxonomy articles created by Polbot